Stenobothrini is a tribe of grasshoppers of the family Acrididae, subfamily Gomphocerinae. They occur in Europe, Asia, and northern Africa.

Genera
Genera include:
Megaulacobothrus Caudell, 1921
Omocestus Bolívar, 1878
Stenobothrus Fischer, 1853

References

External links

Gomphocerinae
Orthoptera tribes